Jésus Pareja (born 6 March 1955) is a retired  Spanish racing driver.
Pareja drove in the FIA World Sports-Prototype Championship, the Spanish Touring Car Championship and Global GT Championship.

The 1990 Montreal incident 

Pareja was involved in a massive accident during the 1990 WSPC round at Montreal. On his 59th lap driving a Porsche 962C entered by (and shared with) Walter Brun, he hit a fragment of a manhole cover which had been torn out of the ground by a car further ahead. Several cars hit the debris but Pareja was especially unfortunate. His fuel tank was ruptured and the car immediately burst into flames. Remarkably, the marshals were able to put the fire out and rescue Pareja.

Later career 

Jésus Pareja was a winner of the Le Mans 24 hours in the GT2 class in 1994. 
From 1999, Pareja had been involved with the running of the European GT Championship and the Spanish Formula 3 Championship.

Jesús Pareja is the founder and CEO of GT Sport which was created in 1998 and runs the International GT Open and the Euroformula open.

References

1955 births
Living people
Spanish racing drivers
24 Hours of Le Mans drivers
World Sportscar Championship drivers
24 Hours of Spa drivers

Larbre Compétition drivers